Shri Ramdeobaba College of Engineering and Management (RCOEM), formerly Shri Ramdeobaba Kamla Nehru Engineering College (SRKNEC), is a college in Nagpur, Maharashtra, India.

It is an ISO 9001:2015 certified institution and NAAC Accredited with 'A+' grade. The college was established in 1984 by Shri Ramdeobaba Sarvajanik Samiti trust. The college was granted academic autonomy from the session 2011–12. All engineering programs of the college are NBA accredited (Washington Accord).

The institute is approved by AICTE, New Delhi and Government of Maharashtra and is permanently affiliated to Rashtrasant Tukadoji Maharaj Nagpur University (RTMNU). It is accredited by National Board of Accreditation (AICTE) for all eligible branches. It is a recognized centre for research for Ph.D. and M.E. (by research) by RTMNU.

Departments 
 Civil Engineering  
 Computer Science and Engineering 
 Electrical Engineering
 Electronics and Communication Engineering 
 Electronics Design Technology
 Electronics Engineering 
 Industrial Engineering
 Information Technology 
 Mechanical Engineering
 Computer Science and Engineering (AI &ML)
 Computer Science and Engineering (Cyber Security)
 Computer Science and Engineering (data Science)
 Biomedical Engineering
 Computer Applications (Masters)
 Business Administration (Masters)

Rankings

The National Institutional Ranking Framework (NIRF) ranked it 119 among engineering colleges in 2021.

Notable alumni  

 Saiju Kurup, Malayalam cinema actor, has a cult following for his role as Arackal Abu in the 2015 comedy movie Aadu.
 Rajneesh Gurbani, Indian cricketer who plays for Vidarbha.

References

Engineering colleges in Nagpur
Rashtrasant Tukadoji Maharaj Nagpur University